European Women in Mathematics (EWM) is an international association of women working in the field of mathematics in Europe. The association participates in political and strategic work to promote the role of women in mathematics and offers its members direct support. Its goals include encouraging women to study mathematics and providing visibility to women mathematicians. It is the "first and best known" of several organizations devoted to women in mathematics in Europe.

Mission 
European Women in Mathematics aims to encourage women to study mathematics, support women in their careers, provide a meeting place for like-minded people and highlight and make women mathematicians visible. In this way, and by promoting scientific communication and working with groups and organisations with similar goals, they spread their vision of mathematics and science.

Mentorship 
EWM has a mentoring programme which can be joined at any time of the year. EWM brings together a younger and a more experienced member to share different experiences and perspectives for motivation and inspiration.

Grants 
EWM awards travel grants for female mathematicians every year. The travel grants are awarded to EWM members who are at an early stage of their career or work in a developing country and who need financial resources (travel and/or accommodation, up to 400 EUR) to attend and speak at an important conference in their field of expertise.

Regular Activities 
Every other year, EWM holds a general meeting and a summer school. A newsletter is published at least twice a year, EWM has a website, a facebook group and an e-mail network. EWM coordinates a mentoring programme and awards a travel grant twice a year.

General Meetings 
EWM hold a General Meeting every other year in the form of a week-long conference with a scientific program of mini-courses on mathematical topics, discussions on the situation of women in the field and a General Assembly.

General meetings have been held in Paris (1986), Copenhagen (1987), Warwick (1988), Lisbon (1990), Marseilles (1991), Warsaw (1993), Madrid (1995), Trieste ICTP (1997), Hannover (1999),  Malta (2001), Luminy (2003), Volgograd (2005), Cambridge (2007), Novi Sad (2009), Barcelona (2011), Bonn (2013), Cortona (2015), and Graz (2018).

Activities at international conferences 
EWM holds satellite conferences to the European Congress in Mathematics and takes part in ICWM International Conference of Women in Mathematics, International Congress of Women Mathematicians and now World Meeting for Women Mathematicians.

History 
Although the group that became EWM began holding informal meetings as early as 1974,
EWM was founded as an organization in 1986 by Bodil Branner, Caroline Series, Gudrun Kalmbach, Marie-Françoise Roy, and Dona Strauss, inspired by the activities of the Association for Women in Mathematics in the USA. It was established as an association under Finnish law in 1993 with its seat in Helsinki.
In fact, the basic structure defining the convenor, standing committee and coordinators were established between 1987 and 1991. An EWM email net was set up in 1994 followed by a web page in 1997.

The organization has a Scientific Committee, jointly with the European Mathematical Society and its Committee on Women in Mathematics.

Convenors and Deputies

Similar Societies 
There are many similar societies like the "European Women in Mathematics" society that celebrate women in Mathematics. For instance:

Women in Mathematics 
International Mathematical Union (IMU) Committee for Women in Mathematics
EMS Women in Mathematics Committee
EMS/EWM Scientific Committee
Femmes et mathématiques
EWM - The Netherlands 
LMS Women in Mathematics Committee
Korea Women in Mathematical Sciences
AWM, Association for Women in Mathematics
Women in Math Project
AWSE Association of Women in Science and Education in Russian

Mathematics 

 The European Mathematical Information Service (EMIS)
 The International Mathematical Union (IMU)
 Math Archives WWW server

European Union Information 

 EMS, European Mathematical Society

References

External links 
Official website

Mathematical societies
Organizations established in 1986
Organizations for women in science and technology
Pan-European learned societies
Women in mathematics